The Capture of the sloop William refers to a small single ship action fought between John "Calico Jack" Rackham and English privateer Jonathan Barnet. The battle was fought in the vicinity of Negril, Jamaica and ended with the capture of Rackham and his crew.

Background
Rackham commanded William, a small but fast twelve-ton sloop during the action. Her armament was light, consisting of at least four cannons, and at the time of battle carried a crew of fourteen including Rackham and the pirates Mary Read and Anne Bonny. Calico Jack was originally a pirate under Captain Charles Vane, but soon after gained his own ship. In 1719, he sailed to New Providence to receive a pardon and a letter of marque from Governor of New Providence Captain Woodes Rogers. The War of the Quadruple Alliance had begun, and England hoped to make privateers of Caribbean brigands fight the Spanish. Captain Rackham was capable of receiving a pardon, but he did not receive a commission to attack the Spanish fleet.

Calico settled in New Providence, where he met Anne Bonny, but when his money was gone he returned to his life of crime. On August 22, 1719, Rackham and 8 other men, stole and took to the seas aboard the sloop William, in Nassau harbor.

The Governor of Jamaica, Nicholas Lawes, directed Captain Jonathan Barnet to take two sloops on a mission to hunt him down. One, Snow-Tyger, was heavily armed with several guns and carried about twenty Royal Navy sailors and some British Army troops; the other was Mary Anne (under former pirate Jean Bonadvis) which carried about twenty men. Bonadvis was the first to spot Rackham, who fired on him; Bonadvis then retreated to report Rackham's position to Barnet, but did not further participate in the battle.  The encounter is remembered more for its participants than the actual combat.

Capture
On or about October 31, 1720, Rackham's sloop was laid at anchor near Negril and fired a gun which caught the attention of Jean Bonadvis' sloop. Bonadvis reported this to Barnet who sailed to investigate the sloop. At 10 PM Barnet called out to the sloop and inquired as to who they were. The reply was "John Rackham from Cuba" and Barnet immediately ordered him to strike his colors. Someone (Barnet testified that because of it being so dark he could not identify who) replied that they would not surrender and fired a swivel gun at Barnet's sloop. Barnet ordered a broadside which destroyed the boom on Rackham's ship and his crew called for quarter.

Barnet had the men put ashore at Davis's Cove near Lucea where Major Richard James, a militia officer, placed them under arrest.

Aftermath
Rackham and his crew were brought to Spanish Town, Jamaica, in November 1720, where they were tried and convicted of piracy and sentenced to be hanged. Rackham was gibbeted on Rackham's Cay at the entrance of Port Royal. The remains of the other pirates were placed at various locations around the port. Mary Read and Anne Bonny avoided hanging by claiming that they were pregnant, Read died several months later before her scheduled execution, while Bonny was never heard from again. Some accounts say Bonny retired and settled in North America and others say she returned to piracy.

References

 A General History of the Pyrates by Captain Charles Johnson (1724)
 Pringle, Peter, Jolly Roger: The Story of the Great Age of Piracy, Dover Publishing Company (2004)
 Lord Archibald Hamilton "An answer to an anonymous libel, entitled Articles exhibited against lord Archibald Hamilton, late governour of Jamaica" (1718)

Conflicts in 1720
Naval battles involving Great Britain
Naval battles involving pirates